William Wickham may refer to:

William Wickham (bishop) (1539–1595), English bishop
William Wickham (1761–1840), British civil servant and politician; spymaster during the French Revolution
William Wickham (cricketer) (1825–1845), English cricketer
William Wickham (Conservative politician) (1831–1897), Member of Parliament for Petersfield, 1892–1897; grandson of William Wickham (1761–1840)
William Wickham (New York politician) (1871–1959), American farmer, businessman, member of the New York State Assembly
William Wickham (1782–1860), social reformer and campaigner for the Parliamentary Reform Act 1832
William H. Wickham (1832–1893), New York mayor

See also
William of Wykeham (1320–1404), Bishop of Winchester and Lord Chancellor
Williams Carter Wickham (1820–1888), American lawyer, judge, politician, and Confederate cavalry general